Vivo Por Elena (English: I live for Elena) is a Mexican telenovela produced by Juan Osorio for Televisa in 1998. The telenovela has been repeated several times on different channels since its original airing.

On Monday, April 6, 1998, Canal de las Estrellas started broadcasting Vivo Por Elena weekdays at 8:00pm, replacing Desencuentro. The last episode was broadcast on Friday, September 11, 1998 with Camila replacing it the following Monday.

Victoria Ruffo and Saúl Lisazo starred as protagonists, Cecilia Gabriela is a co-protagonist, while Ana Patricia Rojo, Sebastián Ligarde, Jean Duverger, Arturo Peniche, Pablo Montero and Julieta Bracho starred as antagonists.

Plot
Elena (Victoria Ruffo) is a poor young woman who while attending university to gain a degree in psychology, meets a rich young man named Ernesto (Sebastián Ligarde) whose only goal is to be with as many women as possible, through deception and on more than one occasion, drugs.

After this Elena refuses to see Ernesto again, and swears off ever falling in love again because she believes herself to be damaged because of Ernesto. Elena then focuses solely on her education and graduating so that she can work and help support her two sisters, Chelo (Cecilia Gabriela) and Talita (Anahi).

Chelo is her older sister who was forced to work in a cabaret to support her two younger sisters, Elena and Talita. After graduating she goes to interview at the house of the judge Juan Alberto Montiel (Saúl Lisazo) for the position of particular tutor for Juan Alberto's son who in the absence of his mother Silvia (Ana Patricia Rojo) has become unruly and disrespectful.

Upon first interviewing she is turned down because Juan Alberto believes her too young and inexperienced to properly care for his son. Juan Alberto's adopted mother is Rebeca (Julieta Bracho), who coincidentally is the mother of Ernesto, and therefore Ernesto and Juan Alberto are like brothers in the sense that they grew up together.

Rebeca believing that Juanito (Imanol), Juan Alberto's son, has been too unruly goes to Elena's house to ask her to take the job because no one else has been interested. Elena arrives at the big house and almost immediately has a profound effect on Juanito and little by little Juan Alberto begins to see a change in his son and realizes that it's all thanks to Elena.

Slowly the two, Elena and Juan Alberto, begin to fall in love and as in usual telenovela style there are a whole host of characters that seem adamant in ensuring that the two will not be happy together.

Cast
 
Victoria Ruffo as Elena Carvajal del Monteverde
Saúl Lisazo as Juan Alberto Montiel
Ana Patricia Rojo as Silvia Fonseca de Montiel/Raquel Duran
Sebastián Ligarde as Ernesto de los Monteros
Arturo Peniche as Héctor Rubalcava
Cecilia Gabriela as Consuelo "Chelo" Carvajal
Julieta Bracho as Rebecca de los Monteros
Patricia Álvarez as Lumara
Anahí as Natalia "Talita" Carvajal
Sergio Catalán as Adolfo
Maty Huitrón as Simona Pacheco
Imanol as Juan "Juanito" Montiel Fonseca
Carlos Rotzinger as Lic. Gustavo Linares
Adriana Lavat as Adriana
Adriana Barraza as Hilda "La Machín"
Pablo Montero as Luis Pablo Moreno
José María Torre as Julio
Manuel Landeta as Hugo Milanés
Kelchie Arizmendi as Francisca "Panchita"
Carlos Espejel as Oscar Moreno
Alejandra Procuna as Ely
Leonorilda Ochoa as Aurora
Sergio Corona as Don Fermín de los Reyes de Tizayuca
Luis de Icaza as Demetrio Rojo
Anel as Jenny
Jean Duverger as El Güero/El Negro
Ofelia Guilmáin as Luz María Villalpando "Doña Luz"
Lucía Guilmáin as Enedina Pancardo
Lucila Mariscal as Gardenia
Miguel Garza as Sergio
Hilda Aguirre as Érica Barragán Montes de Oca
Julián Bravo as Francisco "Paco" Valenzuela
Giorgio Palacios as Lalo
Kristoff as El Pecas
Gerardo Gallardo as El Sapo
Serrana as Yolanda
Claudia Silva as Jimena
Tony Flores as Bertoldo
Yadira Santana as Raisa Martín
Mónica Prado as Berta
Héctor Cruz as Roque
Tania Prado as Noemí
Pablo Cheng as Poli
Erika Monarrez as Casimira
Jessica Segura as Marta
Ernesto Valenzuela as Larry
Luz María Aguilar as Abril
Paco Ibáñez as Ausencio
Niurka as Mirta "La Cubana"
Alejandra Meyer as Mrs. Garay/Director of the prison
Constantino Costas as Dr. Justo Cansino
José Antonio Ferral as Genovivo "El Hacendado"
Anthony Álvarez as Leandro
Juan José Origel as El Panameño
Sergio Jiménez

References

External links

1998 telenovelas
Mexican telenovelas
1998 Mexican television series debuts
1998 Mexican television series endings
Television shows set in Mexico
Televisa telenovelas
Mexican television series based on Venezuelan television series
Spanish-language telenovelas